The 6th Ohio Infantry Regiment was a regiment in the Union Army during the American Civil War, primarily serving in the Western Theater in a series of campaigns and battles.

Organization and service

The 6th Ohio Infantry Regiment was organized in southwestern Ohio in the spring of 1861, formed around a nucleus independent militia unit known as the Guthrie Greys. It was mustered into Federal service on May 12. Most of its recruits were from Hamilton County and surrounding areas. Colonel and first Commander was William K. Bosley and Nicholas Longworth Anderson of Cincinnati was its first lieutenant colonel. Anderson served as colonel of the regiment during its last two years of service. The 6th was first sent to western Virginia before mustering out when its initial three-months term of enlistment expired. Reorganized as a three-years regiment, the regiment spent the next three years in the Western Theater before being mustered out on June 23, 1864.

On March 13, 1865, Anderson was brevetted to the rank of major general and brigadier general, for "gallant conduct and meritorious services in the Battle of Stone's River, Dec. 31, 1862" and for "distinguished gallantry and meritorious conduct in the Battle of Chickamauga, Sept. 19 and 20, 1863".

The lineage and history of the 6th Ohio Infantry Regiment was carried on by the 147th Infantry Regiment during World War I as part of the 37th Division, and during World War II as a separate unit. The unit continued as the 1st Battalion, 147th Armor (Ohio Army National Guard) until that unit's reorganization in 2007.

Notes

References

External links
6th OVI Page by Larry Stevens
Civil War Index: 6th Ohio Infantry - 3 Months Service in the American Civil War
Civil War Index: 6th Ohio Infantry - 3 Years Service in the American Civil War

Military units and formations established in 1862
Military units and formations disestablished in 1864
1864 disestablishments in Ohio
Units and formations of the Union Army from Ohio
Cincinnati in the American Civil War